Davide Ancelotti (born 22 July 1989) is an Italian former footballer who serves as assistant manager of Real Madrid.

Early life
Born in Parma, Italy to legendary football coach Carlo Ancelotti and Luisa Gibellini, Davide followed in his father's footsteps, becoming a professional footballer with AC Milan, playing as a midfielder. Following a loan spell and subsequent permanent transfer to Borgomanero, Ancelotti retired as a player in 2009 to pursue a career in management.

At the age of 22, he gained a degree in sports science.

Managerial career
Ancelotti's first foray into football coaching came in 2012, when he was appointed as a fitness coach at French side Paris Saint-Germain, where his father was manager. After Ancelotti Sr. moved to Spain to manage Real Madrid, Davide followed, working as an assistant to the club's fitness coach.

Having received his UEFA A licence in 2016, notably finishing top of his class, he took up the position of assistant manager to Carlo at German side Bayern Munich. At Bayern, he struck up a friendship with Spanish international Thiago Alcântara, and reportedly angered some of the squad with this familiarity, as opposed to a more professional working dynamic, having gone out with a group of players to dinner on a number of occasions.

When Carlo Ancelotti took up the managerial role at Italian club Napoli in 2018, Davide again served as his assistant, and after Ancelotti Sr. was suspended for an away game against Roma, Davide made his managerial debut, stepping in for his father and overseeing a 2–1 loss in November 2019.

In December 2019, Ancelotti moved to England to serve as assistant to his father at Everton. Working alongside fellow assistant Duncan Ferguson, the two would take charge of training sessions.

Having followed his father to Spain to work under him at Real Madrid, it was rumoured that Davide would lead the team against Celta de Vigo in April 2022, following Carlo's COVID-19 diagnosis. However, as Davide lacked a UEFA Pro licence at the time, he was unable to give the team instructions, despite being allowed to stand on the touchline.

Managerial style
Seen as a modern, advanced coach, Ancelotti shares his father's calm, relaxed approach to management. Having worked as a fitness coach, he would often lead pre-match warmups, as he did at Everton with head of conditioning Francesco Mauri. Working closely with his father, notably never referring to him as "dad", the pair would often bounce ideas off each other, with Davide not taking a back seat, leading to a level of interdependency developing between the two.

Personal life
Ancelotti speaks Italian, French, Spanish, German and English.

In June 2022, he married artist Ana Galocha. The pair have two sons, twins Lucas and Leonardo.

References

1989 births
Living people
Sportspeople from Parma
Italian footballers
Italian football managers
Association football midfielders
A.C. Milan players
ACF Fiorentina players
Italian expatriate sportspeople in France
Expatriate football managers in France
Italian expatriate sportspeople in Germany
Expatriate football managers in Germany
Italian expatriate sportspeople in England
Expatriate football managers in England
Italian expatriate sportspeople in Spain
Expatriate football managers in Spain